The Campbellford Memorial Hospital is an Ontario class C and class G 34-bed hospital in the community of Campbellford, municipality of Trent Hills, Northumberland County in central Ontario, Canada. It opened in 1953, is part of the Central East LHIN and is the largest employer in the community. The emergency department had 20,448 visits between April 2009 and Mar 2010

Facilities 
The hospital includes a 24-hour emergency department; a family health team, Hillside Family Medicine, which serves over 16,000 patients and is a teaching practice affiliated with the University of Toronto Faculty of Medicine; a community mental health centre; and a long term care facility. The hospital is recognized for the strength of its infection control program. The hospital is also part of the Ontario Telemedicine Network.

References

External links

Hospital buildings completed in 1953
Hospitals in Ontario
Hospitals established in 1953